Stegastes leucorus, commonly known as the whitetail damselfish, the whitetail gregory or the whitetail major, is a damselfish of the family Pomacentridae. It is native to the tropical eastern Pacific Ocean.

Distribution and habitat
Stegastes leucorus is native to the tropical eastern central Pacific Ocean. Its range extends from Mexico and Baja California to the Revillagigedo Islands and Guadalupe Island.

Status
This fish is common in parts of the Revillagigedo Islands but uncommon on the mainland coast. Because of its shallow water habitat and limited range, the IUCN has listed it as "Vulnerable" in view of the fact that El Niño events periodically affect this area.

References

leucorus
Fish described in 1892